SLNS may refer to:

SLNS (Sri Lanka), Sri Lanka Navy equipment
Signed Logarithmic Number System, a type of logarithmic number system